In Britain and Ireland, coarse fishing refers to angling for rough fish, which are fish species traditionally considered undesirable as a food or game fish. Freshwater game fish are all salmonids — most particularly salmon, trout and char — so generally coarse fish are freshwater fish that are not salmonids. There is disagreement over whether grayling should be classified as a game fish or a coarse fish.

Fly fishing is the technique usually used for freshwater game fishing, while other angling techniques are usually used for coarse fishing. The sport of coarse fishing and the techniques it uses are particularly popular in the United Kingdom and mainland Europe, and as well as in some former British Commonwealth countries and among British expatriates.

The distinction between coarse fish and game fish has no taxonomic basis.  It originated in the United Kingdom in the early 19th century. Prior to that time, recreational fishing was a sport of the gentry, who angled for salmon and trout and called them game fish. There was a view that other fish did not make as good eating, and they were disdained as coarse fish. Coarse fish have scales that are generally larger than the scales of game fish, and they tend to inhabit warmer and stiller waters.

Bait

A large array of baits can be used for a variety of fish. Baits used will vary accordingly to many factors. Some of these deciding factors include the venue being fished, the species of fish being targeted, time of year, and water colour. Also, the options of either moving or still water plays a part in the size, colour or style of bait being used.

When fishing on rivers for game fish, i.e. brown, rainbow, brook and sea trout, salmon and in some cases grayling (game status debated), artificial flies, small spinners and lures are a popular choice for many game anglers due to the way they intentionally mimic a fly or small fish on the surface and top layers of the water, enticing the fish into feeding as it sits among actual live flies and fish fry. Both floating and sinking flies and lures can be used to fish either on the surface or in the upper layers of the water. Usually, in summer months, a spinner or fly maneuver across the surface will bring about a take from a fish, due to the tendency of fish to move into the warmest part of the water, the surface and first layer (about 18 inches) of water below. When fishing a river for coarse fish species such as chub, barbel, roach, dace and bream, the favourite hook baits tend to be maggot (white, red, and bronze), caster (maggot chrysalis), worm, cheese, pellets (halibut, trout, and carp), boilies (round boiled baits typically made with fish meal, milk, and soya) and luncheon meat.

Loose feed can be any of the above baits with a particle bait fed by hand, in a feeder, or by catapult, sometimes in the form of hemp seed, a manufactures fishmeal ground bait.

For still water fishing and commercial fisheries, a huge array of baits are available. Many of the old favourites are still as potent today as they have ever been.

For most species, hook baits such as luncheon meat, bread, sweetcorn, maggot, worm, and pellets will work. When targeting more specific species such as specimen carp baits such as boilies, large pellets, large bunches of maggots, floating baits, large lungworm, tiger nuts, and meat chunks from cat food can work very well. Micro pellets softened along with ground bait can be fed alongside all hook baits mentioned. In the summer months, fish such as carp can be seen feeding off the surface. In this case, a floating dog biscuit or piece of bread floated on the surface can be ideal.

For predatory fish such as pike, zander, perch and eels either dead or live bait can be  used, in the form of a small fish such as a live roach. Some fishing venues ban the use of live baits so dead baits must be used.

Spinning, the use of an artificial lure, is also widely used for predators. These come in many shapes, sizes and colours so they can effectively mimic injured fish and small fast fish. Used at all depths, these can be an exciting method to catch pike and perch.

Rod licences and fishery fees

For all anglers in England and Wales, anybody aged 12 and over must purchase a valid rod license before fishing. This will enable anglers to legally fish in England and Wales for non migratory trout and coarse fish.

A single rod license will enable an angler to fish with up to three rods at any one time. Many specimen carp anglers fish with 3 or 4 rods at once on large lakes to maximized lake coverage and give greater chance of catching.

Most commercial fisheries, and some rivers are operated on a day ticket basis. In the UK, these can range in price depending on the venue. They are usually paid on the bank with a representative of the venue collecting the fees from anglers from the peg (fishing spot) at some time during the day, or prior to commencing fishing. In some cases, season tickets can be purchased.

Some lakes and river stretches are operated by angling clubs which charge annual membership fees. Application forms can be available from local tackle shops or angling club websites. Waiting lists may indicate the waters operated by the club are sought after can be worth the wait. Other fishing venues can be operated by syndicates where membership is usually by invitation. They can sometimes be joined by contacting a senior member of the syndicate.

Tackle and technique
Depending on the situation, different types of fishing tackle can be used. A reel is then attached near the base of the rod to hold a long length of line, which is run to the tip of the rod through eyelets. Once cast out, the line can be retrieved by winding a handle on the reel.

However, the use of "poles" is also now widespread. Here, the line is fixed to the very tip of the rod, with no reel used: in order to retrieve the line, the pole itself is taken apart until the line can be swung to hand. Poles are often very long in order to increase the angler's range—up to 16 meters.

The main techniques used are float fishing, bottom fishing (legering) and lure fishing.

 In float fishing, the bait is suspended beneath a float made of hollow plastic, wood or quill. The top of the float is usually painted a bright colour and bites are indicated by the top of the float dipping under the surface of the water, or moving up in the water. 
 Legering does not use floats. Instead the bait is held on the bottom of the lake or river by a sinker or large weight. Bites are detected by watching the quiver tip of the rod for movement, or with the use of electronic bite alarms, and more advanced tackle such as PVA bags or mesh.
 With lure fishing, either a brightly coloured fishing lure or a small baitfish attached to the hook is towed through the water to attract predatory fish such as pike, zander and perch.

Fly fishing techniques may also be used for certain species, such as grayling or chub.

For float and leger fishing, groundbait is usually thrown into the water to attract fish to the area. Typical baits include nightcrawlers, maggots, bread and sweet corn. Lately, advancements in technology and market competitiveness have led to many types of other ingredients being introduced, including chemicals, such as betaine, that stimulate the feeding response in fish. Boilies are popular baits for carp fishing.

Types
The nature of coarse fishing varies with the dedication and attitude of the angler:

 Pleasure angling: describes anglers who go out to enjoy a relaxing day's fishing, and are content to catch whatever fish they can.
 Match angling: anglers, in teams or as individual entrants, gather together at a venue to catch either as many fish as possible in an allotted period of time, or the greatest total weight of fish. Contests are held at local, regional, national and international levels.
 Specimen hunting: the aim is to catch a large fish of a specific species. Some specimen hunters will fish only for one particular species, with large carp or pike being popular targets in the UK.

Target species

The main target species for this type of angling include:

Less often targeted species include:

 Bullhead (Cottus gobio)
 Eel (Anguilla anguilla)
Gobio gobio (gudgeon)
 Common minnow (Phoxinus phoxinus)
 Powan (Coregonus clupeoides)
 Ruffe (Gymnocephalus cernua)
 Three-spined stickleback (Gasterosteus aculeatus)

A full list of the heaviest fish weights by species, caught on rod and line in the UK can be found at Rod Caught Fish Records UK.

See also
 Rough fish
 Bycatch

Notes

References
 Cholmondeley-Pennell, Henry (1893) Fishing: Pike and other coarse fish 5th edition, revised. Longmans, Green.
 Cooper, Dave (2004). "First Class Fishing". Fishing Magic.
 Lowerson, John (1993). Sport and the English middle classes, 1870–1914. Manchester University Press. .
 Tranter, Neil (1998). Sport, Economy and Society in Britain 1750–1914. Page 101. Cambridge University Press. .

Further reading
 Bailey, John (2008). Where to Coarse Fish in Britain and Ireland. New Holland Publishers Ltd. .
 Marston, Robert Bright (1883) Coarse Fish Culture Clowes and Sons, Limited.
 Partner, Steve (2007). Coarse Fishing Basics. .

External links
 

 UK Coarse Fisheries
 Fishing for fun
 Henfold Lakes: Coarse Fishery Pictures from Surrey,  England
 Anglers net: Coarse fishing articles
 Coarse fishing venues on google maps. Angling Social Networking
 Some basic information on choosing coarse fishing tackle a.k.a. carp fishing tackle
 Have questions about coarse fishing Coarse fishing questions
 Beginners guide to coarse fishing 

Recreational fishing
Recreational fishing in the United Kingdom

sv:Sportfiske#Mete